Thomas Gordon Pearsall (11 April 1920 – 28 December 2003) was an Australian politician. Born in Hobart, Tasmania, he was educated at multiple state schools before becoming a dairy farmer at Kingston. He served in the military from 1940 to 1945 (TX6060 Lt 2/29 Infantry Battalion. POW Malaya and Thai-Burma Railway and served on Kingsborough Council. In 1950, he was elected to the Tasmanian House of Assembly as a Liberal member for Franklin. In 1966, he transferred to national politics, winning the federal House of Representatives seat of Franklin after the retirement of Bill Falkinder. He was defeated in 1969 by Labor candidate Ray Sherry, and returned to farming. Pearsall died in 2003.

References

 

Liberal Party of Australia members of the Parliament of Australia
Members of the Tasmanian House of Assembly
Members of the Australian House of Representatives for Franklin
Members of the Australian House of Representatives
1920 births
2003 deaths
Liberal Party of Australia members of the Parliament of Tasmania
Burma Railway prisoners
20th-century Australian politicians